Jacob van Oudshoorn (died ca. 18 September 1322) was bishop of Utrecht in 1322.

Van Oudshoorn descended from a noble Hollandic house; he was the son of Willem and brother of Dirk van Oudshoorn (1301–1327), lords of Oudshoorn and Aarlanderveen. Van Oudshoorn was deacon in Utrecht before he was elected bishop. He was consecrated by the archbishop of Cologne, Hendrik II van Virnenburg, but pope John XXII only accepted his nomination after the payment of a large amount of money, which ruined his family. Shortly after this he died, according to his own suspicions, from poison. He was called brave, learned and pious.

Literature
Van der Aa, Biographisch Woordenboek der Nederlanden (1852)

1322 deaths
Prince-Bishops of Utrecht
14th-century Roman Catholic bishops in the Holy Roman Empire
People from Alphen aan den Rijn
Year of birth unknown
Medieval Dutch nobility
14th-century people of the Holy Roman Empire